Central and Eastern Europe is a geopolitical term encompassing the countries in the Baltics, Central Europe, Eastern Europe and Southeast Europe (mostly the Balkans), usually meaning former communist states from the Eastern Bloc and Warsaw Pact in Europe. Scholarly literature often uses the abbreviations CEE or CEEC for this term. The Organisation for Economic Co-operation and Development (OECD) also uses the term "Central and Eastern European Countries (CEECs)" for a group comprising some of these countries. This term is sometimes used for "Eastern Europe" instead for more neutral grouping.

Definitions
The term CEE includes the Eastern Bloc (Warsaw Pact) countries west of the post-World War II border with the former Soviet Union; the independent states in former Yugoslavia (which were not considered part of the Eastern bloc); and the three Baltic states – Estonia, Latvia, Lithuania (which chose not to join the CIS with the other 12 former republics of the USSR).

The CEE countries are further subdivided by their accession status to the European Union (EU): the eight first-wave accession countries that joined the EU on 1 May 2004 (Estonia, Latvia, Lithuania, Czech Republic, Slovakia, Poland, Hungary, and Slovenia), the two second-wave accession countries that joined on 1 January 2007 (Romania and Bulgaria) and the third-wave accession country that joined on 1 July 2013 (Croatia). According to the World Bank 2008 analysis, the transition to advanced market economies is over for all 10 countries that joined the EU in 2004 and 2007.

The CEE countries include the former socialist states, which extend east of Austria, Germany (western part), and Italy; north of Greece and Turkey (European part); south of Finland and Sweden; and west of Belarus, Moldova, Russia, and Ukraine:

According to the Organisation for Economic Co-operation and Development, "Central and Eastern European Countries (CEECs) is an OECD term for the group of countries comprising Albania, Bulgaria, Croatia, the Czech Republic, Hungary, Poland, Romania, the Slovak Republic, Slovenia, and the three Baltic States: Estonia, Latvia and Lithuania."

The term Central and Eastern Europe (abbreviated CEE) has displaced the alternative term East-Central Europe in the context of transition countries, mainly because the abbreviation ECE is ambiguous: it commonly stands for Economic Commission for Europe, rather than East-Central Europe.

See also
Baltic states
Central and Eastern European Online Library
Central Europe
East-Central Europe
Eastern Europe
Eastern European Group
European Union
EuroVoc
Regions of Europe
Southeast Europe
Three Seas Initiative
Visegrád Group

References

Regions of Europe
Geographical neologisms
Central Europe
Southeastern Europe
Eastern Europe